Mertensophryne taitana (common names: Taita toad, Black-chested dwarf toad, Taita dwarf toad, dwarf toad) is a species of toad in the family Bufonidae. It is found in southeastern Kenya and southward through Tanzania to southeastern Democratic Republic of the Congo, northern Zambia, Malawi, and adjacent Mozambique. Its natural habitats are sandy places in woodlands, grasslands, open savanna, and agricultural fields. It is an opportunistic breeder utilizing small, temporary pools, and apparently, streams. The tadpole develop very fast, reaching metamorphosis in only 13 days. This adaptable species is not believed to face any significant threats.

References

taitana
Frogs of Africa
Amphibians of the Democratic Republic of the Congo
Amphibians of Kenya
Amphibians of Malawi
Amphibians of Mozambique
Amphibians of Tanzania
Amphibians of Zambia
Amphibians described in 1878
Taxa named by Wilhelm Peters
Taxonomy articles created by Polbot